Amy Jack is an American country music singer.

Early years 
A native of Oklahoma, Jack was raised by a family of music teachers. Jack graduated from the University of Oklahoma with a B.A. in TV/Radio/Film and currently lives in the Dallas-Fort Worth.

Career 
Amy Jack's initial career in the music industry led her to become an account executive for iHeart Media and Cumulus.

Jack's song, “For The Love of the Game” was featured on the 2016 U.S. Olympic Committee's ‘Road to Rio’ Tour, in addition to a featurette for Kobe Bryant on FOX Sports and the ESPN Network during March Madness the same year. Her song, “Shake And Bake” was featured in a Fox Sports segment for Baker Mayfield. Additionally, “Born To Lead,” was featured as the soundtrack to the NCAA's Lombardi Awards.

On January 17, 2020 Jack released her debut album Introducing Amy Jack, produced by Merle Haggard. Featuring a cover of Haggard's “Got Lonely Too Early,” Jack co-wrote ten of the tracks with a team including Dewayne Hitchings and Don Goodman. Jack's latest releases include "Hi Hi You're a Buckeye" and "A Rising Tide Lifts All Boats."

Albums

References

Living people
American women country singers
American country singer-songwriters
University of Oklahoma alumni
Country musicians from Oklahoma
Year of birth missing (living people)
21st-century American women
Singer-songwriters from Oklahoma